Hermann Olshausen (21 August 1796 – 4 September 1839) was a German theologian.

Biography
Olshausen was born at Oldeslohe in Holstein. He was educated at the universities of Kiel (1814) and Berlin (1816), where he was influenced by Schleiermacher and Neander. In 1817 he was awarded the prize at the Festival of the Reformation for an essay, Melanchthons Charakteristik aus seinen Briefen dargestellt (1818). This essay brought him to the notice of the Prussian Minister of Public Worship, and in 1820 he became Privatdozent at Berlin. In 1821, he became professor extraordinarius at the University of Königsberg, and in 1827 professor. In 1834, he became professor at the University of Erlangen.

Olshausen's expertise lay in New Testament exegesis; his Kommentar über sämmtliche Schriften des Neuen Testaments (Commentary on the complete text of the New Testament; completed and revised by Ebrard and Wiesinger) began to appear at Königsberg in 1830, and was translated into English in 4 volumes (Edinburgh, 1847–1849). He had prepared for it by his other works, Die Echtheit der vier kanonischen Evangelien, aus der Geschichte der zwei ersten Jahrhunderte erwiesen (The veracity of the four canonical Gospels demonstrated from the history of the first two centuries, 1823), Ein Wort über tieferen Schriftsinn (1824) and Die biblische Schriftauslegung (1825). In the latter two works, he presents his method of exegesis, and rejects the doctrine of verbal inspiration.

Family
He was a brother of politician Theodor Olshausen and orientalist Justus Olshausen.

References

External links

1796 births
1839 deaths
People from Bad Oldesloe
19th-century German Protestant theologians
People from the Duchy of Holstein
University of Kiel alumni
Humboldt University of Berlin alumni
Academic staff of the Humboldt University of Berlin
Academic staff of the University of Königsberg
Academic staff of the University of Erlangen-Nuremberg
19th-century German male writers
German male non-fiction writers